Dev (born 5 September 1947) is a Punjabi artist and poet based in Switzerland.

Biography 
Dev was born in 1947 in Jagraon, Punjab, India. When he was 5 he moved to Nairobi, where his father was working for the British Railways. He returned to India in 1964. He published his first poetry collection in 1969.

In 1979, he moved to Switzerland because he was highly influenced by Swiss artist Paul Klee. Since then he has lived in various cities in and outside Europe such as Bern, Barcelona and Buenos Aires. He currently lives in Rubigen, Bern.

Works 

 Vidhroh - 1969
 Doosre Kinare Di Talash
 Matlabi Mitti
 Prashan Te Parvaz
 Hun Ton Pehchan
 Shabdant

Awards 

 Schromani Pravesi Panjabi Sahitkar - 1992
 Sahitya Akademi award for his Punjabi poetry collection Shabant - 2001

References 

Punjabi artists
Poets from Punjab, India
1947 births
Living people
Recipients of the Sahitya Akademi Award in Punjabi